Rapdalus pardicolor is a moth in the family Cossidae. It was described by Frederic Moore in 1879. It is found in Taiwan, India, Thailand and Laos.

References

Zeuzerinae
Moths described in 1879
Moths of Asia
Moths of Taiwan